Stuart Douglas Mackenzie is an Australian musician best known as the frontman of psychedelic rock band King Gizzard & the Lizard Wizard.

Early life 
Mackenzie grew up and went to school in Geelong. His father played guitar to him and his brother growing up, which influenced young Mackenzie. Due to his father being a left-handed guitar player, Mackenzie originally learned to play guitar upside down. His early influences were AC/DC, Bob Dylan, Neil Young and Paul Kelly. He began playing guitar and other instruments at age 15. He was later influenced by heavy metal artists like Rammstein, Kreator, Sodom, Slayer and Metallica, but found the style too difficult to play on guitar, so played garage rock and rock and roll. Mackenzie was part of the local music scene in Geelong and performed at various open mics. Mackenzie would join and form several bands within the local Melbourne music scene, some of which included future King Gizzard members such as Michael Cavanagh, Lucas Skinner and Cook Craig.

Career 
Mackenzie has been the chief songwriter, vocalist and co-lead guitarist of King Gizzard & the Lizard Wizard since their formation in 2010. Additionally, Mackenzie occasionally plays bass, keyboards, sitar and flute, and was originally a drummer. The band was formed not long after the group's members left school, and was intended to be a jam band with a focus on improvisation. Mackenzie also built a microtonal guitar based on the Turkish bağlama, with other band members later modifying their instruments to play microtonal music.

Personal life 
Mackenzie is married. His and his wife's first daughter Araminta (Minty) was born in November 2020. They live in Melbourne.

Mackenzie announced in 2022 that he suffers from Crohn's disease, and that the remainder of King Gizzard's European summer tour would be cancelled due to him seeking treatment amidst a "personal health crisis".

References 

1990 births
21st-century Australian male musicians
Living people
Australian rock musicians
Australian rock guitarists
Australian singer-songwriters
Australian heavy metal guitarists
People with Crohn's disease
Australian heavy metal singers
Psychedelic rock musicians

Musicians from Geelong
Lead guitarists
Microtonal musicians
Ableton Live users